Béryl Laramé (born 1 July 1973) is a retired Seychellois female track and field athlete who specialised in high jump and triple jump events. She won two silvers and one bronze medal in the African Championships between 1993 and 2000. Her personal best in triple jump is 12.62 metres (achieved in 2000), which is still the Seychellois national record. She also competed for Seychelles in the 1996 Summer Olympics in Atlanta, but failed to progress to the final round.

International competitions

References

External links

1973 births
Living people
Seychellois female high jumpers
Seychellois triple jumpers
Female long jumpers
Female triple jumpers
Seychellois female athletes
Olympic athletes of Seychelles
Athletes (track and field) at the 1996 Summer Olympics
World Athletics Championships athletes for Seychelles
Commonwealth Games competitors for Seychelles
Athletes (track and field) at the 1994 Commonwealth Games
Athletes (track and field) at the 1998 Commonwealth Games
Athletes (track and field) at the 1999 All-Africa Games
African Games competitors for Seychelles